The following is a list of rulers of the Kingdom of Gera. The Gibe kingdom of Gera was one of the kingdoms in the Gibe region of Ethiopia that emerged in the 19th century.

List of rulers of the Gibe Kingdom of Gera

Source: C. F. Beckingham and G. W. B. Huntingford, Some Records of Ethiopia, 1593-1646 (London: Hakluyt Society, 1954), pp. lxxxivf

See also
Monarchies of Ethiopia
Rulers and heads of state of Ethiopia
Rulers of Ethiopia
Ethiopian aristocratic and court titles

References

Gibe Gera
Gibe Gera
 Gera